Bessieres Island is a small island off the Pilbara coast of north-west Australia. It is uninhabited, however it does contain a lighthouse.

The next total Solar eclipse visible from Western Australia can be seen from Bessieres Island, on April 20, 2023.

References

Uninhabited islands of Australia
Islands of the Pilbara